University College, informally known as Castle, is a college of Durham University in Durham, England.  Centred on Durham Castle on Palace Green, it was founded in 1832 and is the oldest of Durham's colleges. As a constituent college of Durham University, it is listed as a higher education institution under section 216 of the Education Reform Act 1988. Almost all academic activities, such as research and tutoring, occur at a university level.

University College moved into its current location in 1837. Around 150 students are accommodated within Durham Castle. Other college buildings, including converted 18th century houses and purpose-built accommodation from the 1950s, 1970s and 1980s, are within five minutes' walk of the castle. The college has 700 undergraduates and is currently the most over-subscribed college of the university. In 1987 it admitted women undergraduates for the first time, having previously had an all-male student body.

From January 2012 until March 2019 the Master of the college was political theorist David Held. Wendy Powers joined as the college Principal on 1 June 2020.

History

Early years
University College was formed upon the creation of University of Durham in 1832. It was the first college of the university, and is therefore known as the "foundation college", but the university was founded explicitly on the Oxbridge model; the intention was already for the university to develop along collegiate lines in the manner of Oxford and Cambridge, as it has.

Previously, for centuries, Durham Castle had been the bishop's palace for the Bishop of Durham until the residence was moved to Auckland Castle in 1832. Bishop William van Mildert, one of the founders of the university, had intended for the castle to be given to the college. Temporary accommodation for students was provided at the Archdeacon's Inn (now known as Cosin's Hall) on Palace Green until University College moved into its permanent home in 1837 after van Mildert's successor, Edward Maltby, completed renovations of the Castle.

The castle's keep, formerly a ruin, was redeveloped for student accommodation; in particular, the college's chapels and Great Hall have been restored. Since then high levels of maintenance have been, and still are, necessary to preserve the buildings of the castle.The university's second college, Hatfield Hall, was formed in 1846 as a response to the high costs of maintaining Castle. These costs arose from the students' expectations of being provided with servants and room furnishings. 
The university struggled for the rest of the 19th century, held back by a lack of prestige and a distance from the centres of power in the UK. 
By 1882, Castle contained some 79 undergraduates out of 205 at the university as a whole. Despite the university largely failing to gain recognition and prestige, a number of other colleges had opened by the end of the nineteenth century. Of these, Bishop Cosin's Hall failed to become financially viable and was absorbed into University College in 1864. Enrolment numbers continued to fluctuate.

1919–38
The inter-war years were transformative for Castle. The college was the smallest in Durham university, with just 34 undergraduates in 1928,
and was struggling to meet maintenance costs. The Castle, situated on the banks of "The Peninsula", was in danger of collapsing into the River Wear and many of its internal structures were weak. The combination of high costs and low undergraduate numbers meant that the college was often threatened with closure or merger with Hatfield. Castle was saved largely through charitable donations. A visit in the 1920s from Edward, Prince of Wales (later Edward VIII), helped increase the profile of the cause. In the 1920s, the castle's foundations were secured through reinforcement with concrete. Following these and other extensive building refurbishments of the 1920s and 1930s the college was now able to expand.

Post-war
One of its most successful periods followed during the Second World War when personnel of the Durham University Air Squadron were posted in the castle, doing short courses before joining the Royal Air Force. Those from the college who died during World War II were commemorated by the redevelopment of the Norman Gallery area of the Castle in the 1950s. This period also saw the launch of Castellum, an annual journal of the Castle Society, created to keep former students in touch with college life. In order to continue this expansion, the college purchased Lumley Castle in 1946 to house students, and by 1948 seventy five students were housed there. This section of the college developed a spirit of its own and is still remembered today through activities such as the Lumley Run.

During the 1950s and 1960s the college expanded through developments at Owengate (later renovated in 2014) and Bailey Court, both around Palace Green. In the 1970s, the college's lease of Lumley Castle ended. Moatside Court was instead developed, and meant that all the college's students were now housed within five minutes of the main castle. During this period there was rapid change in the size and structure of the college, which expanded to over 300 undergraduates by 1979.

Female students were admitted to the college for the first time in 1987; until then it had been single sex. Since this time the college has become fully mixed, with undergraduate numbers expanding to nearly seven hundred. Expansion caused a strain on college numbers, however, and in 2004 the college was unable to provide accommodation for all of its fresher students for the first time in its history. Following the foundation of Josephine Butler, Durham's first new college to be opened since 1972, pressure from the university to take on additional students has lessened, and undergraduate numbers have been intentionally reduced in recent years.

College traditions

College arms 
Although it had been in use before this period, the college arms were officially granted by the College of Arms on 29 May 1912, on the occasion of the eightieth anniversary since the founding of the college by the Bishop of Durham in 1832. The arms are blazoned: Azure, a Cross patonce or, between four Lions rampant Argent, on a Chief of the last, the Cross of St Cuthbert Sable, between two Durham Mitres Gules. The blue field with the gold cross and four lions are the arms of the Diocese of Durham, the mitres represent the Bishop and St. Cuthbert's cross is included as Durham Cathedral is dedicated to, and is the resting place of St. Cuthbert. Underneath is the motto, in Latin, "Non nobis solum", meaning "Not for ourselves alone". It is derived from a sentence quoting Plato in Cicero's most influential philosophical work, his treatise De Officiis (On Duties).

Grace 
Before being served at formal hall, on the Tuesday and Thursday evening of each week during term-time, students recite the following Latin grace, led by a senior member of the JCR. Although the origin of the grace is officially unknown, an almost identical version was in use at the time as a post-prandial grace by Westminster School.   Domine omnipotens, aeterne Deus; qui tam benigne nos pascere hoc tempore dignatus es; largire nobis, ut tibi semper pro tua in nos bonitate ex animo gratias agamus; vitam honeste et pie transigamus; et studia ea sectemur quae gloriam tuam illustrare et ecclesiae tuae adiumenta esse possint; per Christum dominum nostrum. Amen.  Translated into English, it reads as follows:Almighty Lord, eternal God; who hast so graciously deigned to feed us at this time; grant to us, that we may ever give Thee heartfelt thanks for Thy goodness to us; that we may pass our lives honourably and piously; and that we may follow such pursuits as can shed light on Thy glory and afford assistance to Thy church; through Christ our Lord. Amen.

Buildings and architecture

Construction of Durham Castle began in 1072, which makes it the oldest building in use at any University in the world.
The castle retains much of its original design and structure, and is part of a UNESCO World Heritage Site with Durham Cathedral.

The castle's northern wing originally contained a dining hall, but this was later divided up to make more luxurious quarters for the Prince Bishop. This area is also home to the two chapels of the college. The Norman Chapel dates from the 11th century and is the oldest accessible part of the castle, and retains its original Saxon architectural style. The Tunstall Chapel is the larger of the two; it dates from the 15th century and is named after Cuthbert Tunstall. It houses the college organ. Both chapels are used for worship within the college. University College is one of two colleges in Durham to have two chapels, the other being Hild Bede.

To the east of the courtyard lies the Keep. It was re-built in the 1840 by Anthony Salvin, having previously lain in ruins. This area has the largest concentration of students living in the castle. To the south of the courtyard is the Gatehouse, built originally by Hugh de Puiset in the 12th century and re-developed in the sixteenth and eighteenth centuries. Around this are the college's more modern offices.

The college's other buildings are at Moatside Court, Owengate and Bailey Court. The developments at Moatside Court and Bailey Court date from the 1960s and 1970s, whilst Owengate was formed from a series of old houses in the 1950s. Of these, Moatside Court's rooms were of a notoriously poor quality, but have recently been renovated at the cost of over £1 million. Moatside now contains a gym and kitchens on every floor.

Great Hall
To the west of the courtyard is the medieval Great Hall, still used as a dining room by students and staff. It was built during the time of Anthony Bek in the 13th century. For two hundred years this was the largest Great Hall in Great Britain; however, it was shortened by Richard Foxe. It still stands some 14 m (46 ft) high and 30 m (98 ft) long. The black staircase that leads from the Great Hall to the Senior Common Room dates from 1662, and is another of the older sections of the college still in use. Underneath the Hall is the college bar, located in an 11th-century undercroft. Around these are student accommodation, the Lowe Library, and kitchens. The Victorian minstrel's gallery at the southern end of the hall is now used a student study space.

Lowe Library
The Lowe Library is the college's library. It was formed from a bequest from Colonel W.D.Lowe, an officer of the Durham University Officers' Training Corps. He later became a Classics tutor at the university and rowing coach for University College, staying until his death in 1921. The library was opened in 1925, extended into the college's wine cellar in 1997, and now contains over 10,000 books. Spread over three floors, it acts as a support to the central university library, providing access to core textbooks.

Masters 

The college is run by a "Master", the most senior position in the SCR. As the first master of University College, Archdeacon Charles Thorp, also held the post of university warden. Following Thorp's death in 1862 the mastership was created as a separate position. All past Masters have their portrait hanging in the Great Hall or SCR ante-room.

List of Masters 
Charles Thorp 1832–1862
 Joseph Waite 1865–1873
 Herbert Booth 1873–1875
 Alfred Plummer 1875–1902
Henry Gee 1902–1919
 Henry Ellershaw 1919–1930
 J. H. How 1930–1939
Angus Macfarlane-Grieve 1939–1954
 Len Slater 1954–1973
 D. W. McDowall 1973–1978
 Edward Salthouse 1979–1998
Maurice Tucker 1998–2011
 Eva Schumacher-Reid (acting) 2011
David Held 2012–2019
 Richard Lawrie (acting) 2019
Graham Towl (acting) 2019
Wendy Powers 2020–present

Role and activities

University College is the most over-subscribed college at the university; for entry in 2006, there were 2,858 applications for just 170 places (approximately 17 applicants for every place). As with all colleges at Durham, students study for degrees with Durham University, not their college, and teaching takes place in academic departments. University College is a "listed body" under the Education Reform Act (1988).

Although colleges are largely concerned with welfare, leisure and accommodation, University College has been running the 'Durham Castle Lecture Series' since 2012. Past speakers have included Saskia Sassen, Gayatri Chakravorty Spivak, Rowan Williams, Anthony Giddens, Justin Welby, Martin Wolf, Noam Chomsky and Peter Singer.

Within Durham's colleges, there is a strong competitive rivalry. Castle's main rival is Hatfield College, which is Durham's second oldest college, having separated from Castle in the 1850s. The rivalry is maintained by student pranks and tricks and in various intercollegiate sporting events.

The college has a commercial arm, taking advantage of the attractive nature of the college's buildings. It hosts corporate events, conferences and weddings during the university vacations.

The Castle is open to tourists only via guided tours. These occur daily outside of term time, but are more restricted during the term due to potential conflicts with the running of the college. Furthermore, events in the university timetable may result in their cancellation. Tourists are not otherwise permitted entry to the college or any common areas. There is relatively little conflict between students and tourists, with many of the guided tours done by students themselves.

Formals 
Students are expected to wear smart clothes and gowns during Formals, which take place twice a week on Tuesdays and Thursdays in the Great Hall. All those attending the formal must stand when the High Table enters, when grace is being said or sung, and when the Senior Student is bowing out. Complete silence is observed during these periods. Following grace, there is no standing throughout the formal until the Senior Student has bowed out to the Master, a symbol of the official opening or closing of the formal meal.

Student body

Some 700 undergraduates attend Castle, making it slightly smaller than the average Durham college. Of these students, around 100 live in the castle itself, while another 250 are housed in the college's surrounding buildings.
It remains the most popular college in Durham for applications, with around 27 students applying for every available place.

The undergraduate student body (Junior Common Room or JCR) is governed by an elected Executive Committee headed by the Senior Student and supported by several other officers. Regular JCR meetings are held to discuss and vote on important issues. There are several other elected non-executive officers such as Returning Officer, Fresher Rep and Sports Captain who organise other important college functions. The Senior Student meets regularly with college and university authorities to represent the JCR.

The JCR runs three balls every year for its students, with one held during each term. The largest is the end of year June Ball, which is the social highlight of the academic year. Tradition dictates that its theme remains closely hidden until the doors to the Castle open.

The graduate community at Castle forms the Middle Common Room (MCR), which is based in the Maurice Tucker (previously William de St-Calais) Room. However, due to size restrictions, no members of the MCR are currently able to live in the college grounds. The MCR, like the JCR, organises a number of social events and activities, such as the college's entry into the inter-collegiate University Challenge competition, which acts as trials for the university's team. The Senior Common Room (SCR), is an organisation of academics and tutors connected to the college. The SCR also organises formal meals with guest speakers.

The student bar of University College is called the Undercroft Bar (known colloquially as The Undie), due to its location in an 11th-century Undercroft. It developed from the original Junior Common Room, which opened in the early 1950s. It is currently run by the Food and Beverage Services Manager with the help of several JCR members. In 2018 a new college café replaced the Toastie Bar in the West Courtyard.

Societies
University College JCR also supports many societies run exclusively for Castle students. The most popular societies include University College Boat Club (UCBC), Castle Theatre Company, Mixed Lacrosse, Castle Rugby Club, Castle Football Club, and Castle Hockey Club.

There are a number of arts societies within the college. Most notable is Castle Theatre Company, which produces a play each term. These plays are usually performed on the college's grounds, although they sometimes tour nationally. They have also appeared at the Edinburgh Festival Fringe.

Castle Society
The Castle Society was formed in 1947 by Castle Alumni. It was originally named the Durham Castleman's Society. Membership is open to anyone with academic ties to the college, and its aim is to create a wider Castle community beyond its immediate students. The society makes regular donations to the college library, chapel, student bursaries, and various college societies. It has helped fund a number of projects in the college, including the accommodation at Moatside Court and Fellows Garden, as well as the West Courtyard Common Room. The Castle Society produces the annual journal "Castellum", which chronicles life at the Castle and reports on activities of Castle alumni. Since 1990, it has contributed towards the University College Durham Trust, the college's charitable fund.

Notable alumni

Castle alumni are active through organisations and events such as the two annual reunion dinners, which cater for the more than 7,000 living alumni. 
A number of Castle alumni have made significant contributions in the fields of government, law, science, academia, business, arts, journalism, and athletics, among others.

Gallery

References

Further reading

 Bythell, Duncan. (1985) Durham Castle: University College, Durham. Norwich: Jarrold Colour Publications.
 Jones, Edgar (1996), University College Durham: A Social History, Edgar Jones

External links

 University College official website
 University College JCR undergraduate student organisation
 University College MCR postgraduate student organisation
 University College SCR staff organisation

Colleges of Durham University
Educational institutions established in 1832
1832 establishments in England
Grade I listed educational buildings
Grade I listed buildings in County Durham
University College, Durham